Liubomyr Roman Vynar or Lubomyr Wynar (2 January 1932 – 16 April 2017) was a Ukrainian-American scholar and historian. Wynar was born in Lwów, Poland (now Lviv, Ukraine) and studied history at the Ludwig Maximilians University and the Ukrainian Free University in Munich. He then studied in the United States where he received a degree in archival studies and library science at the Western Reserve University in Cleveland. From 1969 to 1996, he taught at Kent State University in Kent, Ohio where he also founded and directed the Center for the Study of Ethnic Publications and Cultural Institution and edited the Ethnic Forum Journal of Ethnic Studies (1980-1995).

He was President of the Ukrainian American Association of University Professors from 1981 to 1984 and again from 2004 to 2012 and Vice President of the Ukrainian Academy of Arts and Sciences, chairing its history section. He headed the World Scholarly Council at the Ukrainian World Congress and was a full member of the Shevchenko Scientific Society. In 1965 he founded the Ukrainian Historical Association (UHA), a non-profit organization which he also directed. In 1989, he became a member of the executive committee of the Ukrainian National Council, leading its academic field.

He wrote and edited more than 85 books on Ukrainian history and published more than 2000 articles.

Awards 
 Antonovych prize (2009)

Notes

References

External links 
 Institute for Ukrainian Diaspora Studies // The National University of Ostroh Academy
 Books by Lubomyr Roman Wynar
  Books by Lubomyr Roman Wynar
  Любомир Винар // Українці в світі (Ukrainians in the world)

Writers from Lviv
20th-century American historians
Polish emigrants to the United States
1932 births
2017 deaths
20th-century Ukrainian historians